The German Maritime Search and Rescue Service ( - DGzRS, ; lit. German Society for the Rescue of Shipwrecked Persons) is responsible for Search and Rescue in German territorial waters in the North Sea and the Baltic Sea, including the Exclusive Economic Zone.

The headquarters and the Maritime Rescue Coordination Centre of the Society are located in Bremen. It was founded in Kiel on 29 May 1865. It owns 60 lifeboats at 55 stations which are operated by 185 employed crew members and 800 volunteers. The society has about 2000 engagements every year. Up to 2019, it rescued approximately 85,000 persons. In 2019 it saved 81 lives, rescued 270 persons from critical situations and carried out 373 medical transports. The DGzRS is entirely financed by membership fees, private donations and legacies.

Writer and honorary member Nikolai von Michalewsky has immortalized the DGzRS in his series of science fiction novels by taking it as the model for his "Independent Society for Saving Spacewrecked".

Fleet
The DGzRS operates 59 vessels on 55 stations in the North Sea and Baltic. 20 of which are seagoing cruisers (German: Seenotrettungskreuzer) between 20 m and 46 m of length and 39 vessels are classified as inshore lifeboats (German: Seenotrettungsboote). A feature of the cruisers is that all but the 20-m class carry a fully equipped small lifeboat on deck which can quickly be released through a gate in the aft for conducting operations in shallow waters. This principle was developed by DGzRS in the 1950s. The 20-m class uses a rigid-hulled inflatable boat instead.

Lifeboats

Voluntary Lifeboats

Gallery

See also
 German Federal Coast Guard
 Koninklijke Nederlandse Redding Maatschappij
 Lebanese Sea Rescue Unit
 Redningsselskapet
 Royal National Lifeboat Institution
 Sociedad de Salvamento y Seguridad Marítima
 Société Nationale de Sauvetage en Mer
 Whitfords Volunteer Sea Rescue Group - One of the 3 last independent charitable lifeboat stations left in Western Australia after the others came under the government FESA umbrella (some coerced, some voluntarily), the group and the other two still face government pressure to be nationalised)

References

External links

Official English language website
Men in Red - Hermann Helms
 

Organisations based in Bremen (city)
Sea rescue organizations
Organizations established in 1865
Emergency services in Germany
Charities based in Germany
Non-profit organisations based in Bremen (state)